Lynette Curran is an Australian actress  known for many roles in Australian television series and films, including the soap opera Bellbird, and the films Country Town (1971) and Bliss (1985).

Theatre 
She started acting in the theatre in 1964. Theatre work includes The Country Wife, Rookery Nook, Richard II, Just Between Ourselves, and Ashes for the Melbourne Theatre Company. She also played in Steaming for the Seymour Centre in Sydney.

Film and television 
Curran was a cast member of soap opera Bellbird when it started in 1967. She left the series permanently in 1974; at the time she left she was the program's last remaining original cast member.

Curran acted in the film version of the serial Country Town (1971). She made several other film appearances in the 1970s, with roles in sex comedy Alvin Purple (1973), and in dramas I'm Here, Darlings! (1975), Caddie (1976). Late 1970s television appearances include soap opera Number 96 (in 1976), and police procedurals Bluey and Cop Shop. Curran was a recurring cast member of soap opera The Restless Years (1977–1981), playing the scheming Jean Stafford. She won a Sammy Award for her role in Australian Broadcasting Corporation series Spring and Fall.

She co-starred with Barry Otto in the acclaimed 1985 film adaptation of Peter Carey's award-winning novel Bliss.

Other roles include feature films Heatwave 1982, The Delinquents (1989), The Boys (1998), Japanese Story (2003), Somersault (2004), These Final Hours (2013), A Few Less Men (2017) and Brothers Nest' '(2018).

For her appearance in Somersault she won the 2004 AACTA award for Best Actress in a Supporting Role.

On television she played Brenda Jackson in the Love My Way, and acted in Underbelly: The Golden Mile and Cleverman. She was in Wentworth as Vera Bennett's elderly, terminally-ill mother (2015).

Curran appears in Season 2 of Aftertaste'' (2022).

Filmography

FILM

TELEVISION

References

External links
 

Australian film actresses
Australian television actresses
Living people
1945 births
Australian stage actresses
Best Supporting Actress AACTA Award winners
20th-century Australian actresses
21st-century Australian actresses